Paraceratheriidae is an extinct family of long-limbed, hornless rhinocerotoids that originated in the Eocene epoch and lived until the early Miocene. The first paraceratheres were only about the size of large dogs, growing progressively larger in the late Eocene and Oligocene. They were most common in the rainforest floodplain region which is now Kazakhstan, India, and southwest China, and lived further inland throughout northern and central Asia as well.

The paraceratheres reached the peak of their evolution from the middle Oligocene to the early Miocene, where they became very large, herbivorous mammals. Most genera were about the size of modern draft horses and the extinct giant horse Equus giganteus, with some growing significantly larger. The largest genus was Dzungariotherium, which was more than twice as heavy as a bull African elephant, and was one of the largest land mammals that ever lived. However, they remained confined to Asia, which at the time was mostly lush lowland floodplains. No fossil remains of paraceratheres have been found in Europe or North America, even though the paraceratheres had millions of years of opportunities to reach those regions. The collision with the Indian subcontinent and the Himalayan uplift led to global cooling, desertification, and the disappearance of forest habitats, which resulted in the extinction of these giant ungulates.

Although considered a subfamily of the family Hyracodontidae by some authors, recent authors treat the paraceratheres as a distinct family, Paraceratheriidae (Wang et al. 2016 recover hyracodonts as more basal than paraceratheres).

References

Eocene rhinoceroses
Aquitanian extinctions
Eocene first appearances
Oligocene rhinoceroses
Miocene rhinoceroses
Fossil taxa described in 1923